Ilse Bezaan (born January 1, 1968) is a Dutch politician affiliated to the Party for Freedom (PVV). 

Bezaan attended a hospitality management college in Maastricht before studying a law degree at the University of Amsterdam. She subsequently worked as a corporate lawyer. From 2006 to 2019 she also ran a yoga school. In 2015 she was elected for the PVV in the Provincial Council of North Holland. In 2019, Bezaan was elected a member of the Senate with preferential votes.

References

External links
  Parliament.com biography

1968 births
Living people
People from Amsterdam
University of Amsterdam alumni
Party for Freedom politicians
21st-century Dutch politicians
Members of the Senate (Netherlands)
21st-century Dutch women politicians
Members of the Provincial Council of North Holland